Procanthia distantii is a moth in the subfamily Arctiinae. It was described by Hermann Dewitz in 1881. It is found in South Africa.

References

Endemic moths of South Africa
Moths described in 1881
Arctiini